The men's 400 metres at the 2011 IPC Athletics World Championships is held at the QEII Stadium on 22-23 and 26–29 January

Medalists

T11
The Men's 400 metres, T11 was held on January 26–27

T11 = visual impairment - range from no light perception, to light perception with the inability to recognise the shape of a hand.

Results

Heats

Qualification: First 1 in each heat(Q) and the next 2 fastest(q) advance to the final.

Final

Key:   CR = Championship Record, SB = Season Best

T12
The Men's 400 metres, T12 was held on January 22 and 23

T12 = visual impairment - may be able to recognise the shape of a hand and have a visual acuity of 2/60 and/or visual field of less than 5 degrees.

Results

Heats
Qualification: First 1 in each heat(Q) and the next 1 fastest(q) advance to the final.

Final

Key:   SB = Season Best

T13
The Men's 400 metres, T13 was held on January 28 and 29

T13 = visual impairment: visual acuity ranges from 2/60 to 6/60 and/or has a visual field of more than 5 degrees and less than 20 degrees.

Results

Heats
Qualification: First 3 in each heat (Q) and the next 2 fastest (q) advance to the final.

Key:   R 163.3 = Leaving the lane

Final

Key:   CR = Championship Record, SB = Season Best

T34
The Men's 400 metres, T34 was held on January 27

T34 = good functional strength with minimal limitation in arms or trunk. Compete in a wheelchair.

Results

Final

Key:   CR = Championship Record, SB = Season Best, R 163.3 = Leaving the lane

T36

Results
The Men's 400 metres, T36 was held on January 28 and 29

T36 = walk without assistance or assistive devices, more control problems with upper than lower limbs. All four limbs are involved, dynamic balance often better than static balance.

Heats
Qualification: First 3 in each heat (Q) and the next 2 fastest (q) advance to the final.

Key:   WR = World Record

Final

Key:   WR = World Record, AR= Continental Record

T37

Results
The Men's 400 metres, T37 was held on January 29

T37 = spasticity in an arm and leg on the same side, good functional ability on the other side, better development, good arm and hand control.

Final

Key:   CR = Championship Record, AR= Continental Record, PB = Personal Best, SB = Season Best

T38

Results
The Men's 400 metres, T38 was held on January 28 and 29

T38 = meet the minimum disability criteria for athletes with cerebral palsy, head injury or stroke, a limitation in function that impacts on sports performance.

Heats
Qualification: First 3 in each heat (Q) and the next 2 fastest (q) advance to the final.

Key:   SB = Season Best

Final

Key:   WR = World Record, AR = Continental Record, SB = Season Best

T44
The Men's 400 metres, T44 was held on January 29

T44 = single below knee amputation, or equivalent impairment.

Also T43 classified athletes competed in this event: double below knee amputations or equivalent impairments.

Results

Final

Key:   SB = Season Best

T46

Results
The Men's 400 metres, T46 was held on January 28 and 29

T46 = single above or below elbow amputation or equivalent impairment.

Final

Key:   AR = Continental Record, SB = Season Best

T52

Results
The Men's 400 metres, T52 was held on January 28 and 29

T52 = good shoulder, elbow and wrist function, poor to normal finger flexion and extension, no trunk or leg function.

Final

Key:   CR = Championship Record, SB = Season Best

T53

Results
The Men's 400 metres, T53 was held on January 28 and 29

T53 = normal upper limb function, no abdominal, leg or lower spinal function.

Heats
Qualification: First 3 in each heat (Q) and the next 2 fastest (q) advance to the final.

Key:   CR = Championship Record, SB = Season's Best

Final

Key:   CR = Championship Record, AR = Continental Record

T54

Results
The Men's 400 metres, T13 was held on January 28 and 29

T54 = normal upper limb function, partial to normal trunk function, may have significant function of the lower limbs.

Heats
Qualification: First 3 in each heat (Q) and the next 4 fastest (q) advance to the semi-finals.

Semifinals
Qualification: First 3 in each heat (Q) and the next 2 fastest (q) advance to the final.

Key:   CR = Championship Record, SB = Season Best, R 163.3 = Leaving the lane

Final

See also
List of IPC world records in athletics

References
General
Complete Results Book from the 2011 IPC Athletics World Championships 
Schedule and results, Official site of the 2011 IPC Athletics World Championships
IPC Athletics Classification Explained, Scottish Disability Sport
Specific

External links
ParalympicSport.TV on YouTube
2011 IPC Athletics World Championships: Men's 400mT13
2011 IPC Athletics World Championships: Men's 400m T34
2011 IPC Athletics World Championships: Men's 400m T36
2011 IPC Athletics World Championships:: Men's 400m T37
2011 IPC Athletics World Championships: Men's 400m T38
2011 IPC Athletics World Championships: Men's 400m T44
2011 IPC Athletics World Championships: Men's 400m T52

400 metres
400 metres at the World Para Athletics Championships